This is a list of television stations in Oceania:

List of television stations in American Samoa
List of television stations in Australia
List of television stations in Borneo
List of television stations in Fiji
List of television stations in French Polynesia
List of television stations in the Federated States of Micronesia
List of television stations in New Zealand, incl. Cook Islands
List of television stations in Papua New Guinea
List of television stations in Samoa
List of television stations in Tonga
List of television stations in Western Papua and  Irian
List of television stations in the Solomon Islands

See also: Lists of television channels

Oceania
Television in Oceania
Television stations